This is a list of notable dance and ballet companies.

Notes

References

See also
List of folk dance performance groups
List of ballet companies in the United States
List of dancers

 
Companies
Dance